Cadet College, Hasan Abdal (CCH) Urdu/Pashto :کیدت کالج/کیڈٹ کالج حسن ابدال is a residential secondary school located in Hasan Abdal, Attock District, Punjab, Pakistan.

The college has over 500 enrolled students aged 13–19 years. The main aim of the academic program is to train students to become 21st century global leaders in their chosen field of influence. The college offers Matriculation as well as GCE 'O' Levels to the students, including those from overseas.

History
Cadet College, Hasan Abdal was the first Cadet college in Pakistan in 1952. It was established by the Punjab government and initiated by General Muhammad Ayub Khan (then Commander-in-Chief of the Pakistan Army) to serve as a feeder institution to the Services Academies. For this purpose, military wings were started in 1952 at Government College, Sahiwal, and Islamia College, Peshawar. When the present buildings were completed in April 1954, these military wings were transferred to Hasan Abdal and the new college opened as Punjab Cadet College, with Hugh Catchpole as the founding Principal. In 1960, the government created a Board of Governors to exercise administrative control over the college. The members of the board include the Honorable Governor of Punjab — Chairman Board of Governors, Chairman POF’s Board — Vice Chairman, Commissioner, Rawalpindi Division (Member), Secretary, Finance Dept, Govt of Punjab - Member, Secretary School, Education Dept, Govt of Punjab — Member and
Principal, Cadet College Hasanabdal — Member. Since then, it has been known as Cadet College Hasanabdal.

Wings
The college is divided into six wings:

Student life
Students attending Cadet College, Hasan Abdal, are called Cadets.

The college prepares boys for the secondary school and intermediate examinations conducted by the Board of Intermediate and Secondary Education Rawalpindi, and also for the General Certificate of Education 'O' Levels and 'A' Levels, which follow a similar format to the GCSEs and 'A' levels used in the UK. Some cadets study for Matriculation or F.Sc. (both pre-medical and pre-engineering). English, Urdu, Islamiyat, Pakistan studies, mathematics, physics, chemistry, and biology are compulsory at each level; some other subjects (e.g. computer science) are offered within the different levels.

Fitness activities include gymnastics, jogging, and athletics. Physical training (PT) is conducted in the mornings and sports in the evenings. Cadets take part in sports such as basketball, field hockey, football, horse riding, squash, swimming, tennis, and volleyball. Students are also taught drill.

Classes are conducted in the morning and preps (individual silent study periods) at night. The routine is a structured daily regime to promote maximum performance by the students.

Infrastructure

Buildings on the property include a mosque, a two-story education block, college hall—known as Naeem Hall in memory of ex-cadet Captain Naeem Akhtar (Shaheed)— the six boarding wings, two cadet messes—known as Khatlani Hall and Hussain Shah Hall in memory respectively of ex-cadet Lt. Ahmed Farooq Khatlani (Shaheed) and ex-cadet Lt. Hussain Shah (Shaheed)— a swimming pool, a 16-bed hospital, the administrative block, a workshop and a hobbies block. Sports facilities include two squash courts and a number of football, hockey and cricket pitches, as well as a horse-back riding ground. The college has residential accommodation for the teaching and administrative staff based within the college. There is an oval ground in the middle of the college around which all the six wings are located. Recently, every wing has been given a slogan and a mascot. A road –'Scholar's Walk' as called by BOGs - surrounds the oval. It is a cricket ground with flood lights installed around for playing cricket matches even at night.

Notable alumni
The following notable people are graduates of the college:
 Aseer Qayyum — Federal Minister of Health and Special assistant to PM on health 
 Sikandar Sultan Raja — Chief Election Commissioner of Pakistan
 Babar Sattar — Judge of the Islamabad High Court
 Sohaib Abbasi — former Senior Vice President of Oracle Tools and Education divisions, current CEO of Informatica
 Admiral Zafar Mahmood Abbasi — Former Chief of Naval Staff, Pakistan Navy
 Asad Abidi — first Dean of LUMS School of Science and Engineering, Professor of Electrical Engineering at UCLA and Cornell
 Khawaja Muhammad Asif— Minister for Defense and also Minister of Water & Power
 Masood Aslam— Commander XI Corps, Pakistan Army and former Inspector General Training & Evaluation (IG T&E)
 Asfandyar Bukhari — Tamgha i Jurat recipient
 Vice Admiral Tayyab Ali Dogar— former Vice Chief of Naval Staff
 Muhammad Hafizullah — Vice Chancellor, Khyber Medical University, Peshawar
 Hamid Javaid— former Chief of Staff (COS) to the President of Pakistan and former Chairman HIT
 Iftikhar Ali Khan — former Secretary Defence and ex-Chief of the General Staff (CGS), Pakistan Army
Khurram Dastgir Khan — Defense Minister of Pakistan, Previous Minister of Commerce
 Abbas Khattak — former Chief of Air Staff, Pakistan Air Force
 Raja Nadir Pervez Sitara-e-Jurat and Bar
 Javed Ashraf — former Federal Minister of Education, Communication and Railways, Secretary Railways, Commander XXX Corps, Gujranwala and DG ISI
 Sikandar Sultan Raja — Federal Secretary to Govt of Pakistan
 Khalid Shameem Wynne— former Chairman of the Joint Chiefs of Staff Committee
 Muhammad Zakaullah — former Chief of Naval Staff, Pakistan Navy
 Naweed Zaman — Rector, National University of Sciences and Technology (Pakistan), ex-Commandant Army IV Corps
 Khawaja Muhammad Asif – Minister of Defence, Pakistan

See also
Army Burn Hall College
Hasanabdal
Military College Jhelum
PAF Public School Sargodha

References

External links
 Official website

Schools in Punjab, Pakistan
Cadet colleges in Pakistan
 
Boarding schools in Pakistan